Voorhout is a railway station located in Voorhout, Netherlands. The station is on the Amsterdam–Rotterdam railway and the first station opened on 15 February 1892. This station closed on 17 September 1944. On 1 March 1997 the station re-opened. It is a simple station with two platforms on opposite sides of the tracks. The train services are operated by Nederlandse Spoorwegen.

Train service
, the following train services call at this station:

External links
NS website 
Dutch Public Transport journey planner 

Railway stations in South Holland
Railway stations opened in 1892
Railway stations closed in 1944
Railway stations opened in 1997
Railway stations on the Oude Lijn